Cucumber Raita is a variation of raita that can be used as a dip or a salad. It is made by mixing together freshly chopped cucumber, green chillies, and  dahi (yogurt), and optionally finely chopped tomato and onion.
 
It is especially popular in the summer months as it helps to beat the heat. It is often served as a side accompaniment with the main course in Indian cuisine.

See also

 Raita
 List of yogurt-based dishes and beverages

References

External links

 Sanjeev Kapoor's Recipe for Raita 
 Benefits of Cucumber Raita 

Vegetarian dishes of India
Yogurt-based dishes
Raita